Charles Henry "Bo" Wood (born January 24, 1945) is a former American football player and high school coach. He played for the Atlanta Falcons in 1967 and coached the Cherry Hill East Cougars high school team for 33 years.

Early life
Bo Wood was born on January 24, 1945, in Camden, New Jersey, and grew up in Barrington, New Jersey. He attended  Haddon Heights High School. In his school, he was a three-sport athlete and got 11 varsity letters.

Awards and honors

Track
All-South Jersey (1960s)

Swimming
All-South Jersey (1960s)

Football
All-South Jersey (1960s)
Team Captain (1960s)

College career
Wood went to college at North Carolina. In 1964 he had 4 catches for 44 yards. In 1966 he was an All-American selection.

Awards and honors
All-American Selection (1966)

Professional career

New Orleans Saints
In 1967 he was drafted by the New Orleans Saints. He was drafted in the 6th round (159th overall). He made the roster but was traded to the Atlanta Falcons right before the season started.

Atlanta Falcons
In 1967 he played for the Atlanta Falcons. He played in all 14 games but only one statistic was recorded; a 9 yard kick return. He did not make the roster in 1968. He was later signed by a Canadian Football League team but did not play for them.

Later life
After his playing career, he went back to college to get a masters degree. He then was a High School coach for more than 30 years. He first started at Bishop Eustace but then went to the Cherry Hill East Cougars and was there for 33 seasons. 3 players he coached went to the NFL; Pete Kugler, Glenn Foley, and Stan Clayton. In 1988 they won the state championship. In 1987 he was inducted into the New Jersey Coaches Hall of Fame. In 2018 he was inducted into the Cherry Hill East Athletics Hall of Fame.

Notes

References

1945 births
Living people
Haddon Heights Junior/Senior High School alumni

People from Barrington, New Jersey
Players of American football from Camden, New Jersey
North Carolina Tar Heels football players
American football defensive ends
Atlanta Falcons players